The 1929 Virginia gubernatorial election was held on November 5, 1929 to elect the governor of Virginia.

Results

References

1929
Virginia
gubernatorial
November 1929 events